Hypocrita bicolora is a moth of the family Erebidae. It was described by Sulzer in 1776. It is found in Panama.

References

Hypocrita
Moths described in 1776
Taxa named by Johann Heinrich Sulzer